Santa Lucía is the fifth district of the Barva canton, in the Heredia province of Costa Rica.

Toponymy 

The name alludes to Saint Lucia of Syracuse.

History

1998 Tornado 

On September 22, 1998 at 13:30, the district and its surroundings were impacted for 10 minutes by the most damaging tornado recorded in the country, with 179 damaged houses, affecting 600 people. The  (National Weather Institute) still catalogued the event as weak.

Geography 
Santa Lucía has an area of  km² and an elevation of  metres.

It is located in the Greater Metropolitan Area, in the central valley of the country, its borders are to the north with the Barva and San Pablo districts of the Barva canton, to the east the Ángeles district of San Rafael canton, to the south the San Josecito district of San Rafael canton, and to the west the Mercedes district of the Heredia canton.

Three  (creeks, small rivers) cross the district from east to west: Seca creek, Burío creek and Palmar creek, the last two converge as tributaries that form the Burío river in the southern limit of the district.

Residential areas 

There are several residential area completed projects: Urbanización Jardines de Santa Lucía, Urbanización Antiesquivo, Residencial Jardines del Beneficio, Residencial Malinche Real, Urbanización Villa Esmeralda, Residencial La Ronda, Urbanización Don Álvaro, Urbanización Doña Iris, Urbanización El Tajo.

Demographics 

For the 2011 census, Santa Lucía had a population of 7,413 inhabitants.

Economy 

The district is mostly a residential area, with small businesses to attend the necessities of its inhabitants.

Education

Public education 

There is one  (daycare center) named  (Cotton Dreams), and also one public primary school named .

Private education 
There is a private preschool and daycare center, .

There are two private education centers, that teaches preschool, primary school, and high school, and

Culture

Museum 

The  (Popular Culture Museum) is located in the district.

Cultural center 

Leisure 

The  (leisure center) of the workers union of the National University of Costa Rica is also located in the district.

Religion 

Health Care 

There is one  (Ebais) which provides basic first line health care, managed by the Costa Rican Social Security Fund.

Transportation

Road transportation 
The district is covered by the following road routes:
 National Route 126
 National Route 502

There are no railroad access and public transportation relies in bus lines and taxicabs.

Public utilities 

The  (Heredia Public Utilities Company), ESPH, is the main provider of electricity and potable water in the district.

There are plans by ESPH for a sewage treatment plant for this and neighboring districts, as the community relies on residential septic tanks, which is common in the country.

Telecommunications include fiber optic to the home (Provided by ICE Kölbi), cable television and full cellular telephony coverage by ICE Kölbi, Claro and Movistar.

References 

Districts of Costa Rica
Populated places in Heredia Province